The 2021–22 Quaid-e-Azam Trophy was a first-class domestic cricket competition that took place in Pakistan from 20 October to 29 December 2021. In September 2021, the Pakistan Cricket Board (PCB) confirmed the fixtures for the tournament, with the full schedule being announced the following month. Central Punjab and Khyber Pakhtunkhwa were the defending champions, after the final of the previous tournament finished in a tie.

All of the matches played in the first three rounds of the tournament finished as draws. On 7 November 2021, the PCB announced that fourth round match between Central Punjab and Sindh would be played with the pink ball, along with the final of the tournament. The first result other than a draw came in the fourth round of the tournament, when Southern Punjab beat Northern by ten wickets. In the same round, Ahsan Ali became the ninth batsman to score a triple century in the Quaid-e-Azam Trophy, when he made 303 not out in Sindh's match against Central Punjab. All of the matches in round five of the competition also ended as draws. Conversely, only one match in rounds six and seven ended as a draw, with Sindh winning back-to-back matches to lead the table.

Ahead of the tenth and final round of matches, four teams were still in contention of reaching the final. In the tenth round of fixtures, Mohammad Huraira of Northern scored his maiden triple century in first-class cricket. Following the completion of the group stage matches, Northern and Khyber Pakhtunkhwa finished first and second respectively to advance to the final of the tournament. Khyber Pakhtunkhwa won the tournament, beating Northern by 169 runs in the final.

Squads
On 15 October 2021, the PCB confirmed all the squads for the tournament.

Points table

Fixtures

Round 1

Round 2

Round 3

Round 4

Round 5

Round 6

Round 7

Round 8

Round 9

Round 10

Final

References

External links
 Series home at ESPN Cricinfo

Domestic cricket competitions in 2021–22
2021 in Pakistani cricket
2021-22 Quaid-e-Azam Trophy
Pakistani cricket seasons from 2000–01